Red and White may refer to:

The arts
The Red and the White (film), 1967 Hungarian film directed by Miklós Jancsó
The Red and White (album), a 2007 album by Julian Austin
Red & White (EP), a 2022 EP by Lil Uzi Vert

Transportation
Red & White Services, a former bus company in South Wales and Gloucestershire, England
Red & White Fleet, a company which provides ferry services in the San Francisco Bay Area of California

Products and companies
Red & White (food stores), a chain of independent stores in the United States
Red&White, a chain of retail stores in Russia
Red & White, a brand of cigarettes in Eastern Europe produced by Philip Morris International

Other
 Flags that contain red and white
The two sides of the War of the Roses, red rose and white rose
"Up with the Red and White" (Gaelic: Geal 'us Dearg a Suas), the slogan of the Clan Menzies
"The Red and the White", anthem of the Australian Football League club, Sydney Swans

See also
 Kōhaku (disambiguation), Japanese for "red and white"
 Merah Putih (disambiguation), meaning "red and white" in Indonesian (Malayan)
 White (disambiguation)
 Red (disambiguation)